An airboard may refer to:
A self-balancing hoverboard by Airwheel.
A manufacturer of stand-up paddleboard.
An inflatable snow bodyboard, see airboard (sled).